Brian James Bradley (born December 14, 1944) is a Canadian former professional ice hockey player and coach. He played three seasons in the World Hockey Association from 1972 until 1975 with the New York Raiders, New York Golden Blades, Jersey Knights and the San Diego Mariners.

Career
Bradley played junior hockey for the Toronto Marlboros from 1960 until 1963, switching to the Niagara Falls Flyers for the 1963–64 and 1964–65 seasons in the Ontario Hockey Association. He turned professional in 1965 with the Oklahoma City Blazers. He played with the Blazers, Dallas Black Hawks and the Quebec Aces until the formation of the World Hockey Association. Bradley joined the New York Raiders in 1972 and played two seasons with the franchise, becoming the New York Golden Blades in the second season. Bradley played one final season in the WHA with the San Diego Mariners before one final professional season with the Roanoke Valley Rebels of the Southern Hockey League.

References

External links

1944 births
Canadian ice hockey left wingers
Ice hockey people from Ontario
Living people
Jersey Knights players
New York Golden Blades players
New York Raiders players
Quebec Aces (AHL) players
Roanoke Valley Rebels (SHL) players
San Diego Mariners players
Sportspeople from Greater Sudbury